Fifth-generation warfare (5GW) is warfare that is conducted primarily through non-kinetic military action, such as social engineering, misinformation, cyberattacks, along with emerging technologies such as artificial intelligence and fully autonomous systems. Fifth generation warfare has been described by Daniel Abbot as a war of "information and perception". There is no widely agreed upon definition of fifth-generation warfare, and it has been rejected by some scholars, including William S. Lind, who was one of the original theorists of fourth-generation warfare.

History 

The term 'fifth-generation warfare' was first used in 2003 by Robert Steele. The following year, Lind criticised the concept, arguing that the fourth generation had yet to fully materialize.

In 2008, the term was used by Terry Terriff, who presented the 2003 ricin letters as a potential example, but stated that he was not entirely sure if it was a fifth-generation attack, claiming "we may not recognize it as it resolves around us. Or we might look at several alternative futures and see each as fifth generation." Terriff argued that while fifth-generation warfare allows "super-empowered individuals" to make political statements through terrorism, they lack the political power to actually have their demands met.

Characteristics 
Alex P. Schmid said that fifth-generation warfare is typified by its "omnipresent battlefield", and the fact that people engaged in it do not necessarily use military force, instead employing a mixture of kinetic and non-kinetic force. In the 1999 book Unrestricted Warfare, by colonels Qiao Liang and Wang Xiangsui of the People's Liberation Army, they noted that in the years since the 1991 Gulf War, conventional military violence had decreased, which correlated to an increase in "political, economic, and technological violence", which they argued could be more devastating than a conventional war. On the contrary, Thomas P. M. Barnett believes that the effectiveness of fifth-generational warfare is exaggerated, as terrorism conducted by individuals, such as Timothy McVeigh or Ted Kaczynski, lacks the support of more organized movements. This was seconded by George Michael, who noted that in the United States, gang violence was responsible for far more deaths than lone wolf terrorist attacks.

L.C. Rees described the nature of fifth generation warfare as difficult to define in itself, alluding to the third law of science fiction author Arthur C. Clarke – "any sufficiently advanced technology is indistinguishable from magic."

See also 

 Counterinsurgency
 New generation warfare
 Radicalism (politics)
 Subversion

References 

Cyberwarfare
Military doctrines
Military operations by type
Psychological warfare
Social engineering (political science)
Warfare by type
Warfare post-1945